Lotion play is a subset of the better known wet-and-messy fetish (WAM), which typically involves participants using food (such as pudding or whipped cream), mud, or paint as a lubricant to facilitate sexual activity.  Lotion play uses lotion specifically for this purpose.

In Japan, also known as gookakke or gluekakke (a play on words from goo/glue and bukkake), is a popular fetish, a form of Japanese erotica and prostitution request involving the use of copious amounts of lubricant, which in the Japanese language is referred to by the French loanword "lotion" (ローション in Japanese).  Typically lotion play involves a participant rubbing lotion on another using their body, sexual intercourse in a pool or bath filled with lotion, or lotion being poured over the participants during sex.

Lotion is available in concentrated form, to be added to hot water.  A one-gallon concentrate will typically yield 6-10 gallons of lotion (J-Lube Lotion Concentrate).  The main component in most lotion is polyacrylate. A similar effect can be achieved by dissolving powdered methyl cellulose in water.

References

Sexual acts
Sexual fetishism
Japanese pornography
Sexuality in Japan